Daniel Stephen Jones III (born May 27, 1997) is an American football quarterback for the New York Giants of the National Football League (NFL). He played college football at Duke and was selected sixth overall by the Giants in the 2019 NFL Draft.

Early years
Jones attended Charlotte Latin School in Charlotte, North Carolina. During his high school career, he had 6,997 passing yards and 98 touchdowns. Despite these numbers, Jones was barely recruited coming out of high school and was not ranked by Rivals.com. 

Jones originally committed to Princeton University to play college football, but then opted to become a walk-on at Duke University.

College career

2016
After redshirting his first year at Duke in 2015, Jones became the starting quarterback in his sophomore season in 2016 after quarterback Thomas Sirk suffered a season-ending injury. Jones started all 12 games, completing 270 of 430 passes (62.8%) for 2,836 yards, sixteen touchdowns and nine interceptions.

2017

In 2017, he completed 230 of 413 passes (55.7%) for 2,439 yards, 14 touchdowns and 11 interceptions as a junior. Jones was named MVP of the 2017 Quick Lane Bowl against Northern Illinois where he went 27-of-40 with 252 passing yards and two touchdowns, along with 86 rushing yards from sixteen carries for one touchdown.

2018
During his senior year, Jones was named the MVP in the 2018 Independence Bowl, where he went 30–41 with 423 passing yards and five touchdowns in a 56–27 victory over Temple. He later played in the 2019 Senior Bowl for the North team, and was also the MVP of that game, going 8-of-11 with 115 passing yards and one touchdown.

Statistics

Professional career

Jones was drafted by the New York Giants in the first round with the sixth overall pick in the 2019 NFL Draft. On July 22, 2019, Jones signed his four-year rookie contract, worth $25.664 million, including a $16.7 million signing bonus.

2019

Despite a stellar preseason, Jones was named the backup behind Eli Manning. Jones played his first regular season game on September 8, 2019, against the Dallas Cowboys in relief of Manning, where he completed 3-of-4 passes for 17 yards and lost a fumble as the Giants lost 35–17. On September 17, 2019, Jones was named the starter over Manning for the Week 3 matchup against the Tampa Bay Buccaneers. In his first start, Jones completed 23 out of 36 passes for 336 yards with a 112.7 passer rating and two passing touchdowns along with 28 rushing yards and two rushing touchdowns in a 32–31 comeback win against the Buccaneers despite losing two fumbles. He became the first Giants' rookie quarterback to win his first career start since Scott Brunner in 1980. Jones led the Giants back from an 18-point deficit to beat the Buccaneers and became the seventh rookie quarterback in NFL history since 2010 to have a game-winning drive in their first career start. He was also named NFC Offensive Player of the Week for his performance in Week 3. 

On September 29, in his second start (and first start at home), Jones led the Giants to a 24–3 victory over the Washington Redskins. After the game, Jones became the third quarterback in the Giants' history after Phil Simms (1979) and Travis Tidwell (1950) to begin their career with two wins as a starting quarterback for the franchise. 

Jones played his first game on prime time on Thursday Night Football in Week 6 against the New England Patriots. In the game, Jones threw for 161 yards, one touchdown, and three interceptions in the 35–14 loss. In Week 8, against the Detroit Lions, he had 322 passing yards and four passing touchdowns in a 31–26 defeat. In Week 10 against the New York Jets, Jones threw for 308 yards and four touchdowns in the 34–27 loss. In Week 16, Jones threw for career highs of 352 passing yards and five passing touchdowns as the Giants defeated the Washington Redskins in overtime 41–35. In the process, Jones became the fifth quarterback in NFL history to throw five touchdown passes in a game as a rookie. He also became the only rookie quarterback in NFL history to throw for 350 passing yards with five touchdowns and zero interceptions in a single game. He was named the Pepsi Offensive Rookie of the Week for his efforts in the Week 16 win. In Week 17 against the Philadelphia Eagles, Jones threw for 301 yards, one touchdown, and one interception during the 34–17 loss. Jones finished his rookie season with 3,027 passing yards, 24 passing touchdowns, and 12 interceptions to go along with 45 carries for 279 rushing yards, two rushing touchdowns, and had a league-leading 18 fumbles with 11 of them lost.

2020

Jones was selected to be a team captain in his second season. It was the fourteenth consecutive season that the Giants' starting quarterback had served as a captain, as Eli Manning had held the honor for the last thirteen years.

In Week 7 against the Philadelphia Eagles, in the third quarter, Jones ran for an impressive 80 yards on a single play, before losing his balance and tripping on the turf near the endzone. Despite the trip, this rush became the longest run in Giants quarterback history.
In Week 10 against the Philadelphia Eagles, Jones threw for 244 yards and rushed for 64 yards, including a 34-yard rushing touchdown, during the 27–17 win.

Jones injured his hamstring in the third quarter of Week 12 against the Cincinnati Bengals, causing him to miss the rest of the game and the following game against the Seattle Seahawks. He also missed Week 15 against the Cleveland Browns, after suffering an ankle injury against the Arizona Cardinals the week before.
 
In Week 17, in a game against the Dallas Cowboys, Jones had one of his best performances of his young career, completing 17 for 25 passing for 229 yards, 2 touchdowns, and an interception in a 23–19 win. Jones also helped drive the Giants down the field, to set up a jet sweep touchdown to Sterling Shepard. This was also the first time that the Giants had beat the Cowboys since the 2016 season, and  also helped the Giants finish with their best record since the 2016 season. The Giants finished the season at 6–10, and missed the playoffs for the fourth consecutive year after the Washington Football Team beat the Philadelphia Eagles later in the day.

2021

Jones began the 2021 season throwing for 267 yards, one touchdown, rushing for 27 yards and an additional touchdown, and fumbled once in a 27–13 loss to the Denver Broncos. Against the Washington Football Team on Thursday Night Football, Jones threw for 249 yards, rushed for 95 yards, and had two touchdowns, but miscues by the Giants would cost them a pair of touchdowns and haunt them as the Giants lost 29–30. Against the New Orleans Saints, Jones threw for a career-high 402 yards, two touchdowns, and an interception as the Giants won 27–21 in overtime. As a result of his performance, Jones was named NFC Offensive Player of the Week. In Week 7 against the Carolina Panthers, Jones threw for 203 yards, one touchdown, zero interceptions, rushed for 28 yards, and recorded his first career reception thrown by Dante Pettis for 16 yards in the 25–3 win. 

In Week 12 against the Philadelphia Eagles, Jones suffered a neck injury, causing him to miss the remainder of the season. On December 20, 2021, Jones was placed on injured reserve. Jones finished his 2021 season with 2,428 passing yards, 10 passing touchdowns, and 7 interceptions to go along with 62 carries for 298 rushing yards and two rushing touchdowns.

2022

In April 2022, the Giants declined Jones's fifth-year option for 2023.

In the season opener against the Tennessee Titans, Jones threw for 188 yards, two touchdowns, and an interception in the 21–20 comeback win. In Week 5 against the Green Bay Packers, Jones completed 21 passes of 27 attempts, threw for 217 yards, and rushed for 37 yards with 10 carries in an upset win. In Week 7 against the Jacksonville Jaguars Jones threw for 202 yards and a touchdown, and rushed for 107 yards becoming the first Giants QB to record 100 rush yards in a game since Frank Filchock in 1946 in the 23–17 win. As a result of his performance, Jones was named NFC Offensive Player of the Week for Week 7.

In Week 16 against the Minnesota Vikings, Jones threw for 334 yards, a touchdown, and an interception in the 27–24 loss. The next week against the Indianapolis Colts, Jones threw for 177 yards, two touchdowns, and rushed for 91 yards and two touchdowns in the 38–10 win, helping the Giants clinch a playoff berth for the first time since 2016.

After winning the Wild Card playoff game against the Minnesota Vikings, Jones made NFL history by becoming the first player ever with 300+ passing yards, 2+ touchdown passes, and 70+ rushing yards in a playoff game.

2023
On March 7, 2023, Jones signed a four-year, $160 million contract extension with the Giants.

NFL career statistics

Regular season

Postseason

Giants franchise records 
 Most games started (rookie season): 12 (2019)
 Most completions (rookie season): 284 (2019) 
 Most pass attempts (rookie season): 459 (2019) 
 Highest completion percentage (rookie season): 61.9% (2019)
 Most passing yards (rookie season): 3,027 (2019) 
 Most passing touchdowns (rookie season): 24 (2019) 
 Best passer rating (rookie season): 87.7 (2019)
 Most pass yards per game (rookie season): 232.8 (2019)
 Most fourth quarter comebacks (rookie season): 1 (2019) (tied with six other players)
 Most game winning drives (rookie season): 2 (2019)
 Longest quarterback run: 80 yards (October 22, 2020 vs. Philadelphia Eagles)
 First quarterback with 2,500+ passing yards and 400+ rushing yards in a single season (2020)
 First quarterback with 200 yards passing and 100 yards rushing in a single game (2022)

NFL records
 Most passing touchdowns in a single game by a rookie quarterback: 5 (December 22, 2019 vs. Washington Redskins) (tied with four others)
 First rookie to have three games with four touchdown passes and no interceptions
 First player to have 300-plus passing yards, 2-plus touchdown passes, and 70-plus rushing yards (including no interceptions) in a post-season playoff game.

Personal life
Jones was born in Charlotte, North Carolina, on May 27, 1997. He is the oldest son of Becca and Steve Jones. Jones graduated from Duke University in December 2018 with a degree in economics.

Jones' nickname, "Danny Dimes", was coined early during his rookie season.

References

External links

 New York Giants bio
 Duke Blue Devils bio

1997 births
Living people
American football quarterbacks
Duke Blue Devils football players
New York Giants players
People from Charlotte, North Carolina
Players of American football from Charlotte, North Carolina
Sportspeople from Charlotte, North Carolina